Hubrecht's eyebrow lizard (Phoxophrys tuberculata) is an agamid lizard from Indonesia. It is monotypic in the genus Phoxophrys, although all species in the genus  Pelturagonia were previously located here.

References

Further reading
Hubrecht AAW (1881). "On a new genus and species of Agamidae from Sumatra". Notes from the Leyden Museum 3: 51–52. (Phoxophrys new genus; P. tuberculata, new species).

Agamidae
Monotypic lizard genera
Taxa named by Ambrosius Hubrecht